Auguste Maure (Marseille, 1840 - Biskra, 1907) is a French 19th-century photographer.

The "Photographie Saharienne" studio 
Auguste Maure was an orientalist photographer who lived in Biskra (Algeria) from 1855 to 1907. He created the "Photographie Saharienne" studio in 1860 : the very first photography studio in south Algeria. Biskra is the queen of oases, a place where many artists (writers, painters and photographers) came in the 19th century to meet the particular climate, luminosity and landscapes of Sahara desert.

Photographic production 
Auguste Maure was active from 1860 to 1907 and took many photographs of landscapes and cities of south Algeria (El Kantara, Sidi Okba, Chetma, Tilatou, Tolga, Touggourt ...).

The members of the Ouled Naïl tribe, Berber dancers wearing incomparable costumes and covered by jewels, are often represented on Maure photographs very appreciated by the tourists.

The photos gallery

See also
 Orientalism
 List of Orientalist artists

External links 

 Luminous Lint - Auguste Maure
 Michel Megnin website on Algeria photography

1840 births
1907 deaths
19th-century French photographers
Orientalist painters
Photography in Algeria